Chibisov or feminine Chibisova may refer to:

Chibisov
Andrei Chibisov (born 1993), Russian ice hockey player 
Gennady Chibisov (1946–2008), Soviet/Russian cosmologist
Nikandr Chibisov (1892-1959), Soviet military commander and Hero of the Soviet Union
Sergei Chibisov (born 2000), Russian footballer

Chibisova
Ksenia Chibisova (born 1988), Russian judoka
Oksana Chibisova (born 1977), Russian shot putter

See also
 Chebyshev (disambiguation)